Yahor Sharamkou (born 1999) is a Belarusian artistic gymnast.

In 2019, he won the silver medal in the vault event at the 2019 Summer Universiade held in Naples, Italy.

In 2020, he won the silver medal in the vault event and the bronze medal in the floor event at the 2020 European Men's Artistic Gymnastics Championships held in Mersin, Turkey.

In 2022, he won the gold medal in the floor event at the 2022 FIG Artistic Gymnastics Apparatus World Cup competition in Cottbus, Germany.

References

External links 
 

Living people
1999 births
Place of birth missing (living people)
Belarusian male artistic gymnasts
Universiade medalists in gymnastics
Universiade silver medalists for Belarus
Medalists at the 2019 Summer Universiade
Gymnasts at the 2019 European Games
21st-century Belarusian people